is a railway station in Uonuma, Niigata, Japan, operated by East Japan Railway Company (JR East).

Lines

Station layout
The station consists of one side platform and two island platforms serving five tracks. The platforms are connected by a footbridge. The station has a Midori no Madoguchi  staffed ticket office.

Platforms

History 
The station opened on 1 September 1923 as an intermediate station on the Jōetsu Line.

With the privatization of Japanese National Railways (JNR) on 1 April 1987, the station came under the control of JR East.

Passenger statistics
In fiscal 2015, the station was used by an average of 940 passengers daily (boarding passengers only).

Surrounding area
former Koide town hall
Koide Post Office
 Koide High School
Koide Middle School
Koide Elementary School
 Japan National Route 17
Japan National Route 352

See also
 List of railway stations in Japan

References

External links

  Koide Station (JR East)

Railway stations in Niigata Prefecture
Stations of East Japan Railway Company
Railway stations in Japan opened in 1923
Jōetsu Line
Tadami Line